Satyarth Nayak (born 29 October 1981) is an Indian author and screenwriter, known for his bestselling novel The Emperor's Riddles, authoring the biography of Sridevi and for scripting Sony's historical television epic Porus. The Emperor's Riddles turned out to be a bestselling thriller with the media calling it "a hit with young readers". Porus created by Swastik Productions was one of the most expensive and acclaimed shows on Indian television. Satyarth's biography of screen legend Sridevi titled Sridevi: The Eternal Screen Goddess published in 2019 by Penguin Random House also went on to win high praise. Satyarth has been named one of the Top 50 Indian authors to follow on social media.

Early life
Satyarth was born in Cuttack, Odisha. Spending his growing up years across cities like Hyderabad, Kolkata, Lucknow, Chennai and New Delhi, he's currently settled in Mumbai. Satyarth holds a Masters in English Literature from St. Stephen's College, Delhi. Working as a Correspondent with CNN-IBN from 2007 to 2011, Satyarth was felicitated with the SAARC Heal Award in 2008. During this phase, his short stories won the British Council prize and also appeared in the Chicken Soup for the Soul series. In 2011, he quit journalism to become a full-time author and screenwriter.

As author

The Emperor's Riddles

The idea for The Emperor's Riddles was born out of a random Internet search by Nayak after reading the Dan Brown thriller Angels & Demons to find out if there was something similarly esoteric and mysterious hidden in the history of India. The surfing yielded an obscure but fascinating conspiracy theory involving one of the greatest Emperors of ancient India. Nayak was intrigued by the Emperor's legend and the imperial secret believed to be still alive and functioning and decided to capture this story. The first draft took about six months and was ready in 2011. The manuscript was accepted by Red Ink Literary Agency and subsequently underwent another round of editing. Nayak received publishing offers from Rupa & Co. and Amaryllis and he eventually signed the deal with Amaryllis in 2012. The book was first released at the New Delhi World Book Fair in February 2014. The Emperor's Riddles was met with a positive response. The book earned acclaim from other mystery writers, with Amish Tripathi calling it "a fantastic blend of myth, imagination and mystery", and Ashwin Sanghi describing it as "Intelligent, Intriguing, Imaginative, Intense". While The Times of India called it a "history meets mystery", Hindustan Times called it "a gripping tale of intrigue" and lauded the book for its "taut narration and interesting climax". HT Brunch magazine included the book in its Summer Reading List of 2014, calling it "a celebration of our great Indian civilisation and its scientific genius" and recommending it for those who like "riddles and cool mythological references". Yahoo praised the book as an "extraordinary tale of riddles". The Hindu described it as a "concoction of mystery, thriller, legend" and a "national bestseller" while The Pioneer lauded how "history is being explored by the new-age writers like never before". The New Indian Express declared the thriller "a hit with young readers" and said it "opened a completely different avenue for budding writers to experiment with". While English Vinglish director Gauri Shinde called the book "an acclaimed thriller" via Twitter, the SpectralHues book review said the thriller's "shock twist towards the end makes you feel so ignorant" and that "a Christopher Nolan of the West or our very own Anurag Kashyap can pretty well give it a thought to bring The Emperor’s Riddles to life on screen". Since its release, The Emperor's Riddles has been likened to the mystery novels of Dan Brown. In an interview with The Times of India, Nayak stated that "the fact that the book's earning comparisons with Dan Brown is overwhelming" and "If Brown has codes, my book has riddles."

Venom
Satyarth followed The Emperor's Riddles with Venom which also won positive reviews with Times of India stating that "the pure imagination behind the tale is riveting and the different elements of contemporary India the author includes just makes it more than a mytho-fiction." and Free Press Journal saying that the book "slowly (but positively) spreads its poisonous tentacles of a gripping thriller that keeps readers hooked while checking on Google for the mythology references. It’s thrilling!"

Sridevi: The Eternal Screen Goddess

In 2019, Satyarth announced his first non-fiction book on India's First Female Superstar Sridevi. The book titled Sridevi: The Eternal Screen Goddess published by Penguin Random House and backed by Boney Kapoor. Upon release, the biography earned high acclaim with The Times of India calling it "a treat for any Bollywood fan" and The Hindu calling it "an eminently readable account". While India Today described it as "rooted in honest love for its subject", The Week described it as "a convincing retelling of the actor's life" and Mid-Day described it as "diligently researched, deeply felt". Vogue India called it "a rare insight into Sridevi" and Firstpost praised it as "that one work of literature one might seek out to decode Sridevi". -->

100 Tales from the Puranas
In July 2020, Satyarth announced his first book on Indian mythology titled 100 Tales from the Puranas to be published by Westland Press. Deepthi Talwar from Westland Press told the media "We’re very excited about the collection that Satyarth has put together. He takes us through popular legends and lesser known stories from the Puranas, delving into the minds of several characters to psychoanalyse their actions." In October 2020, The Telegraph featured the book on their list of highly anticipated books of 2021 saying "Dabbling into Indian mythology this time, he promises to write stories from the Puranas that still find resonance in today’s time and impart the wisdom that can find relevance in our lives. Deep research has always been the base of Nayak’s books so one can hope that this time too, he will not disappoint." After Westland Press closed down in 2022, the book was then acquired by HarperCollins India who issued the statement that "We at Harper are excited to be publishing Satyarth’s upcoming book based on the Puranas. The magnum opus will be a treat for fans of Indian mythology."

As Screenwriter

Porus

In 2017, Satyarth joined Swastik Productions to write the screenplay for Porus based on the story of Porus (King of Pauravas) and Alexander The Great ( King of Macedonia). The show aired from 27 November 2017 to present on SET India. It is India's most expensive series with a budget of INR 500 crores (US$70 million). It became India's first Global-TV series and also first Indian series to reach Japan. It has been dubbed and subbed in many languages and is already sold to over 11 countries and 14 territories. In Sri Lanka, it airs on Sirasa TV, dubbed into Sinhala under the name Digvijaya. The rights to the drama have also been sold to Thailand, Malaysia, Cambodia, Myanmar, Laos, and Vietnam. It is also dubbed in Tamil as Maaveeran which currently airs on Sun Life channel, Sun TV network from October 2018 onwards. The Malayalam version is titled Porus which currently airs on Surya TV from January 2019.

Awards

 Youth Inspiration Award (Literature) 2017
 Shri Award for Men Achievers (Literature) 2016
 SAARC Heal Honour Award 2008

See also
The Emperor's Riddles
Porus

References 

1981 births
Living people
People from Cuttack
21st-century Indian writers
Indian screenwriters
St. Stephen's College, Delhi alumni
21st-century Indian screenwriters